Association Sportive Police, commonly referred to as AS Police, is  a Senegalese association football club based in Dakar. 

The club was also formerly known as:
Association Sportive et Culturelle de Police (ASC Police)
Association Sportive et Culturelle Forces de Police (ASF Police)

Achievements
Senegal Premier League: 1 (1979)
Senegal FA Cup: 3 (1976, 1978, 1981)
Coupe de l'Assemblée Nationale: 2 (1979, 1981)

Performance in CAF competitions
African Cup of Champions Clubs: 1 appearance
1980: Quarter-finals

References

Football clubs in Senegal
Sports clubs in Dakar
Police association football clubs